Liberty Christian School is a private, non-denominational Christian school located in Richland, Washington.

Sources
http://www.libertychristian.net/

Christian schools in Washington (state)
Nondenominational Christian schools in the United States
Private high schools in Washington (state)
High schools in Benton County, Washington
Richland, Washington